Opharus muricolor, the mousey-gray tiger moth, is a moth of the family Erebidae. It was described by Harrison Gray Dyar Jr. in 1898. It is found in the US states of Arizona, New Mexico and Texas.

Adults have been recorded on wing from May to August.

References

Opharus
Moths described in 1898
Moths of North America